David Fredriksson (born October 4, 1985, in Jönköping, Sweden) is a Swedish ice hockey player, currently with HV71 in the Swedish elite league Elitserien.

Playing career
Fredriksson, often called "Tuppen" (The Rooster), started his playing career with HV71's youth team in 2001. In season 2005–06 he became a regular in HV71 but has been sidelined by injuries during 2007 and 2008. In late January, 2009, he injured his hand, several tendons severed, when a skate ran over it during a training session. He will be out for the remainder of season 2008–09. He will play for the 2012-2013 season with Dragons de Rouen (France).

Fredriksson has won the Swedish Championship twice, 2004 and 2008, both times with HV71. He was drafted by the St. Louis Blues in the seventh round of the 2004 NHL Entry Draft, 211th overall.

Awards
 Swedish Champion with HV71 in 2004 and 2008.

Career statistics

Regular season and playoffs

International

References

External links

1985 births
Living people
HV71 players
St. Louis Blues draft picks
Swedish ice hockey forwards
Sportspeople from Jönköping